Élan Sportif Chalonnais, commonly known as Élan Chalon, is a French professional basketball club that is based in Chalon-sur-Saône, France. The team's main colors are red and white, and their mascot is a moose. The team's home arena is called Le Colisée, which seats 4,540 spectators.

Founded in 1955, the club has traditionally been playing in the Pro A. In 2012, the club captured its first domestic championship by winning the Pro A Final over Le Mans. In 2017, Élan won its second domestic title. The club has also been a regular in European competitions, as the team has been runners-up in three different FIBA competitions.

History

The club was founded in 1955, after the merger of Association Sportive Chalonnaise and Élan de Saint-Jean des Vignes. The club then merged with the football club Bourgneuf Val d'Or Mercurey of Bourgneuf Mercurey in 1970. The club reached full professional status in 1994.

In the 2011–12 season, Chalon won the LNB Pro A title which meant they had won their first ever French championship. Élan Chalon won the Final of the league 95–76 over Le Mans Sarthe Basket. Billy Ouattara and Clint Capela, respectively 24 points and 22 points, led the team to the win in the Final.

In the 2012–13 season, Élan played its first Euroleague season in history: the club was eliminated after the regular seasons in which the club recorded 3 wins and 7 losses.

In the 2016, Chalon reached the Final Four of the FIBA Europe Cup. The club hosted the Final Four at Le Colisée and ended on the third place after beating Russian side Enisey in the third-place game.

The following 2016–17 season was another successful one for the club. Élan reached one further stage of the FIBA Europe Cup Final this time, by reaching the Final. In the double-legged Final, Chalon lost to other French side Nanterre 92. In the Pro, A the club captured its second national title after defeating SIG Strasbourg 3–2 in the Finals.

Logos

Players

Current roster

Notable players

Honours

Total titles: 6

Domestic competitions
 French League
 Winners (2): 2011–12, 2016–17
 French Cup
 Winners (2): 2011, 2012
 Leaders Cup
 Winners (1): 2012
 Runners-up (2): 2011, 2016
 French Super Cup
 Runners-up (3): 2011, 2012, 2017

European competitions
 FIBA Saporta Cup 
 Runners-up (1): 2000–01
 FIBA EuroChallenge
 Runners-up (1): 2011–12
 FIBA Europe Cup
 Runners-up (1): 2016–17
 3rd place (1): 2015–16

Other competitions
 Bourg, France Basketball Tournament
 Winners (1): 2008

Season by season

Head coaches
 Philippe Hervé
 Gregor Beugnot
 Jean-Denys Choulet

References

External links
 
Eurobasket.com Team Page

ChalonSurSaone
Basketball teams established in 1955
Sport in Saône-et-Loire
Chalon-sur-Saône
1955 establishments in France